William Schwalbe (born July 13, 1962) is an author, entrepreneur and journalist based in New York City. He is the author of three books and was the former editor-in-chief of Hyperion Books. In 2008, he founded the recipe web site Cookstr, which was acquired by Macmillan Publishing in 2014, where he serves as executive vice president.

His first book, SEND: Why People Email So Badly and How to Do it Better, was co-written with David Shipley, and was published by Penguin Random House in 2010. The book was reviewed by Dave Barry in The New York Times, became a business bestseller and was featured in an interview with Schwalbe on The Colbert Report on June 20, 2007.

The End Of Your Life Book Club, which described Schwalbe's relationship with his mother Mary Anne Schwalbe through books before her passing, was published by Knopf in 2012, and spent more than four months on the New York Times Bestseller List. It was widely reviewed by outlets such as The New York Times, The Boston Globe, USA Today, Chicago Reader, The New Yorker, Bookpage, and Entertainment Weekly.

As a journalist, he has written for various publications, including The New York Times and The South China Morning Post.

Books for Living was published in December 2016 by Knopf, and consists of essays about 26 different books that affected the author's life. The Boston Globe described it as a "natural follow-on" to his previous book. Among the books described by Schwalbe include, Homer's The Odyssey, Herman Melville's Bartleby the Scrivener, E.B. White's Stuart Little and Paula Hawkins' The Girl on the Train.

His sister, Nina Schwalbe, is an American public health researcher.

Bibliography

 SEND: Why People Email So Badly and How to Do it Better (2010)
 The End Of Your Life Book Club (2012)
 Books for Living (2016)

References

American essayists
Living people
1962 births
American technology writers
American chief executives
Place of birth missing (living people)
Gay memoirists
American memoirists
American gay writers
American LGBT businesspeople